Derek Carrier (born July 25, 1990) is an American football tight end who is currently a free agent. Carrier played college football at Beloit College.

Early years
Carrier attended Edgerton High School in Edgerton, Wisconsin where he started for three years on the baseball and basketball teams and for two years on the football team.

College career
The Wisconsin Badgers offered Carrier the opportunity to play college football as a preferred walk-on but Carrier instead chose to attend NCAA Division III Beloit College because Beloit also offered to allow him to play college basketball. After two years, Carrier left the basketball team and began running indoor track, competing in the 55 meters, long jump and triple jump. Carrier was a member of the Sigma Chi fraternity and was pre-med.

Professional career

Oakland Raiders
Carrier was signed by the Oakland Raiders as an undrafted free agent on April 28, 2012. He was signed to a three-year, $1.44 million contract. On August 30, 2012, he was waived by the Raiders.

Philadelphia Eagles
On September 11, 2012, he was signed by the Philadelphia Eagles and added to the practice squad. On August 25, 2013, he was released by the Eagles.

San Francisco 49ers
On September 3, 2013, he was signed by the San Francisco 49ers and added to the practice squad.  On November 16, 2013, he was promoted to the active roster.

On March 9, 2015, the San Francisco 49ers signed Carrier to a three-year, $2.98 million contract that includes a signing bonus of $400,000.

Washington Redskins

On August 21, 2015, Carrier was traded to the Washington Redskins for a conditional fifth round pick in the 2017 NFL draft. In Week 5 against Atlanta Falcons, he recorded his first career touchdown on a seven-yard pass from quarterback Kirk Cousins. After tearing his ACL and MCL in Week 14 against the Chicago Bears, the Redskins placed him on injured reserve on December 14.

Carrier started the 2016 season on the PUP list to recover from torn ligaments in his knee. He was officially activated to the active roster on November 12, 2016 prior to Week 10.

Los Angeles Rams
On September 2, 2017, Carrier was traded to the Los Angeles Rams for a 2018 seventh-round draft pick. The Rams traded for him after Temarrick Hemingway suffered a fractured fibula and were in need of a third tight end. He was reunited with his former offensive coordinator in Washington and new Los Angeles Rams' head coach Sean McVay.

On September 10, 2017, in the season opener against the Indianapolis Colts, Carrier had one reception for 12 yards in his Rams debut.

Oakland / Las Vegas Raiders (second stint)
On March 15, 2018, Carrier signed a three-year contract with the Oakland Raiders.

Carrier was fined $15,000 by the NFL on October 5, 2020, for attending a maskless charity event hosted by teammate Darren Waller during the COVID-19 pandemic in violation of the NFL's COVID-19 protocols for the 2020 season.

On March 19, 2021, Carrier re-signed with the Raiders on a one-year contract. He suffered a pec injury in Week 4 and was placed on injured reserve on October 9, 2021. He was activated on January 8, 2022.

References

External links
Washington Redskins bio
San Francisco 49ers bio 
 Beliot College Buccaneers

1990 births
Living people
American football tight ends
People from Edgerton, Wisconsin
Players of American football from Wisconsin
Beloit Buccaneers football players
Las Vegas Raiders players
Oakland Raiders players
Philadelphia Eagles players
San Francisco 49ers players
Washington Redskins players
Los Angeles Rams players